Warren Macdonald (born 1965 in Melbourne, Victoria, Australia) is an Australian environmentalist, explorer, mountain climber, motivational speaker, and writer.

In April 1997 Warren Macdonald was climbing on Hinchinbrook Island, Northern Australia when a giant boulder fell on his legs. Warren survived the accident thanks to Geert van Keulen, a Dutch traveller Warren had met the day before, who raced down the mountain for help. He spent two days out in the open and both his legs were amputated at the thigh.

Ten months later, Warren climbed Cradle Mountain, Tasmania, Australia using a modified wheelchair and the seat of his pants. A year later he climbed Federation Peak in Tasmania, Australia. In February 2003 he became the first double-above knee amputee to reach the summit of Mount Kilimanjaro in Tanzania, Africa's tallest peak while using specialty climbing prostheses developed by Hanger prosthetists Kevin Carroll and Chad Simpson. More recently Warren climbed El Capitan in the Sierra Nevada, California, United States and the Weeping Wall in Alberta, Canada.

Macdonald has written a book called A Test of Will. He told the story of the accident on Discovery Channel's programme I Shouldn't Be Alive. The episode is titled "Trapped Under a Boulder".

Macdonald has lived in Vancouver, British Columbia, and in Australia. Warren currently lives in Canmore, Alberta.

References

External links 
 Official webpage
 Weeping Wall, Alberta

1965 births
Living people
Australian mountain climbers
Australian explorers
Australian environmentalists
Australian memoirists
Australian motivational speakers
Australian amputees
People from Melbourne